The 2015 Dunlop MSA British Touring Car Championship (commonly abbreviated as BTCC) was a motor racing championship for production-based touring cars held across England and Scotland. The championship featured a mix of professional motor racing teams and privately funded amateur drivers competing in highly modified versions of family cars which are sold to the general public and conform to the technical regulations for the championship. The 2015 season was the 58th British Touring Car Championship season and the fifth season for cars conforming to the Next Generation Touring Car (NGTC) specification.

Colin Turkington was the defending drivers' champion. West Surrey Racing was the defending teams' champion, and MG the defending manufacturers' champions.

Teams and drivers

Driver changes
 Changed teams
 Sam Tordoff, moved from MG/Triple Eight to West Surrey Racing.
 Andrew Jordan, moved to the works MG/Triple Eight team from his family run Eurotech Racing.
 Colin Turkington and Jason Plato, both moved to Team BMR from West Surrey Racing and MG/Triple Eight respectively.
 Dave Newsham, moved from AmD Tuning to Power Maxed Racing.
 Jack Goff, moved from Team BMR to Triple Eight Racing.
 James Cole, moved from United Autosports to Motorbase Performance.

 Entering/re-entering BTCC
 Mike Bushell, who raced in the Knockhill round in 2013, will compete in his first full season with AmD Tuning.
 Richard Hawken and Derek Palmer Jr., who competed in the HSCC Super Touring Car Championship for historic touring cars in 2014, will enter the championship with Support Our Paras Racing.
 Jeff Smith will return to the BTCC with Eurotech Racing, having last raced for them in 2013.
 Andy Wilmot will return with Welch Motorsport, having last raced at Rockingham in 2013 for Tony Gilham Racing.
 Triple WTCC champion Andy Priaulx will return with West Surrey Racing, having last raced in the series in 2002.
 Alex Martin, who competed in the Ferrari Challenge in 2014, will enter the championship with Team Parker Racing under the Dextra Racing banner.
 Kieran Gallagher will return with Team HARD, having last raced with the team at Knockhill in 2013.
 Josh Cook, who was runner-up in the 2014 Renault Clio Cup United Kingdom season, will make his BTCC debut with Power Maxed Racing under the #RacingforHeroes banner.
 Ex-motocross rider Stewart Lines will make his BTCC debut with Houseman Racing, having previously raced in the Mini Challenge, Volkswagen Cup and the SEAT Cupra Championship.
 Nicolas Hamilton, half-brother to Formula One world champion Lewis Hamilton and sometime ETCC competitor, will enter the championship with AmD Tuning. However his entry is considered as guest entry and therefore he won't be eligible for points.

 Leaving BTCC
 Ollie Jackson and Nick Foster announced that they would not be returning to the BTCC in 2015. Foster made one-off appearance at Rockingham for Team IHG Rewards Club as replacement for Andy Priaulx, who was unable to participate due to duties in the European Le Mans Series.
 Lea Wood stepped down from his driving duties, to take a management role in his team, Houseman Racing.
 Chris Stockton stepped down from being team owner and driver of BTC Racing, selling the team to Automotive Brands.
 Marc Hynes left the championship to concentrate on the revived Manor F1 Team.
 Alain Menu, Fabrizio Giovanardi and Jack Clarke were unable to find a seat after losing their seats at Team BMR and Motorbase Performance respectively. Menu later returned, replacing the injured Warren Scott for the Brands Hatch season finale.
 Glynn Geddie and Luke Hines left the series after United Autosports left the championship.
 Robb Holland left the championship, having sold his car to AmD Tuning. He later returned to BTCC with Handy Motorsport filling in for Simon Belcher.

Team changes
 Infiniti entered the championship, offering factory support and the Infiniti Q50 as a base model. The cars are being run by Pro Motorsport under the banner of "Support Our Paras Racing". The team lost the Infiniti sponsorship and its manufacturer status following the 3rd round. The team was scaled down to a single entry from the Snetterton round onwards.
 Aiden Moffat Racing switched from a Chevrolet Cruze to a Mercedes-Benz A-Class, built by Ciceley Racing.
 After initially announcing a return in 2015, BTC Racing was sold to title sponsor Automotive Brands in February. The team switched to a saloon version of the Chevrolet Cruze for 2015, having bought Aiden Moffat's 2014 car.
 Team HARD re-entered the series having bought a single Toyota Avensis, previously owned by United Autosports.
 United Autosports left the series after only a single year of participation having sold their licences to Team HARD and Power Maxed Racing respectively.
Motorbase Performance withdrew from the first half of the season, but rejoined the series from the Snetterton round onwards.
Team Dynamics switched from the Honda Civic Tourer to the Honda Civic Type R.

Rule changes
Organisers outlined a series of rule changes for the 2015 season in October 2014:
 The amount of success ballast is now implemented to the top ten drivers on the grid and the championship heading into a weekend instead of five. With more drivers now carrying ballast, the weight has been increased with the maximum being  heavier than in previous years. Rear-wheel drive (RWD) cars carry their success ballast as far forward in the cabin as possible, in order to better equalise the front to rear weight balance between both drivetrain formats.
 Cosworth and Xtrac independently analyse the start-line performances and in-gear acceleration of front and rear-wheel drive cars with a view to more equalising them through engine management programming.
 All engines have now been re-tested and re-validated by both TOCA and an independent specialist company – resulting in a boost level being set for each car and engine type for the season. As the larger amount of success ballast has a greater effect than before, the lap-time boost level adjustment can be dropped.
 Each car must still use the Dunlop soft tyre for one race at nine events – the Thruxton event does not apply as the soft tyre is not used at the venue – but each car must use them three times in race 1, three times in race 2 and three times in race 3 during the course of the season.
 The grid for race 2 at each event is set in the order of the fastest lap times achieved in race 1. If during race 1 a driver changes one or more tyres of the same type then any quicker lap time (if achieved) after that tyre change is discounted.
 The Jack Sears Trophy will be awarded to the top 'Rookie Driver' of the year.

Race calendar
The provisional calendar was announced by the championship organisers on 18 August 2014. After using the "International" circuit configuration in 2014, the Oulton Park round will revert to the "Island" layout.

Results

Championship standings

Notes
No driver may collect more than one point for leading a lap per race regardless of how many laps they lead.

Drivers' Championship
(key)

Manufacturers'/Constructors' Championship

Teams' Championship

Independents' Trophy

Independent Teams' Trophy

Jack Sears Trophy

Notes

References

External links

TouringCarTimes

British Touring Car Championship seasons
Touring Car Championship